Jim Smith (born February 9, 1959) is a Nebraska business leader and former American politician who served as a member of the unicameral Nebraska Legislature. He was born in Pensacola, Florida, and resides in Papillion, Nebraska.   Smith was a member of the American Legislative Exchange Council (ALEC) and served on the organization's National Board of Directors.

Early life
Jim Smith graduated from University of West Florida in 1984 with B.A. in Accounting and from Creighton University in 1996 with an MBA. Prior to public office, he worked in investor-owned and public-power utility operations. Following his corporate career in electric and gas utilities, Smith became a small business owner and investor. After leaving elected office, Smith became CEO and President of Blueprint Nebraska, a strategic Nebraska think tank.

State legislature
Smith was elected in 2010 and 2014 to represent the 14th Nebraska legislative district. He held positions on the Natural Resources Committee and Business & Labor Committee. Later, Smith would become Chair of the Transportation and Telecommunications Committee and the Revenue Committee.  Smith's legislative priorities included energy, transportation and fiscal policy. Smith was the state chairman for the American Legislative Exchange Council and served on the organization's nation board of directors.

See also

 Nebraska Legislature

References

 

1959 births
Living people
Republican Party Nebraska state senators
People from Papillion, Nebraska
21st-century American politicians
People from Pensacola, Florida